Yuan Ye (born 22 September 1993) is a Chinese footballer currently playing as a midfielder for Henan Jianye.

Club career
Yuan Ye was promoted to the senior team of Henan Jianye within the 2012 Chinese Super League season and would make his debut in Chinese FA Cup game on 18 September 2012 against Guangzhou Evergrande in a 2-1 defeat.

Career statistics

References

External links

1993 births
Living people
Chinese footballers
Association football midfielders
China League Two players
Chinese Super League players
Henan Songshan Longmen F.C. players